The Wilshire 5000 Total Market Index, or more simply the Wilshire 5000, is a market-capitalization-weighted index of the market value of all American-stocks actively traded in the United States. As of March 31, 2022, the index contained 3,660 components. The index is intended to measure the performance of most publicly traded companies headquartered in the United States, with readily available price data, (Bulletin Board/penny stocks and stocks of extremely small companies are excluded). Hence, the index includes a majority of the common stocks and REITs traded primarily through New York Stock Exchange, NASDAQ,  or the American Stock Exchange.  Limited partnerships and ADRs are not included. It can be tracked by following the ticker ^W5000.

History
The Wilshire 5000 Total Market Index was established by the Wilshire Associates in 1974, naming it for the approximate number of issues it included at the time. It was renamed the "Dow Jones Wilshire 5000" in April 2004, after Dow Jones & Company assumed responsibility for its calculation and maintenance.  On March 31, 2009, the partnership with Dow Jones was terminated and the index returned to Wilshire Associates.
The base value for the index was 1404.60 points on base date December 31, 1980, when it had a total market capitalization of US$1,404.596 billion.  On that date, each one-index-point change in the index was equal to $1 billion. However, index divisor adjustments due to corporate actions and index composition changes have changed the relationship over time, so that by 2005 each index point reflected a change of about $1.2 billion in the index's total market capitalization.
The index increased tenfold in less than twenty years from its base date, peaking at a 20th-century closing record high of 14,751.64 points on March 24, 2000, a level that would not be surpassed until February 20, 2007. A hypothetical investment in the Wilshire 5000, made at the 2000 peak and with subsequent dividends reinvested, did not become profitable on a closing basis until October 3, 2006.
On April 20, 2007, the index closed above 15,000 for the first time. On that day, the S&P 500 was still several percentage points below its March 2000 high, because small cap issues absent from the S&P 500 and included in the Wilshire 5000 outperformed the large cap issues that dominate the S&P 500 during the cyclical bull market. The index reached an all-time high on October 9, 2007, at the 15,806.69 point level, right before the onset of the Great Recession and the related financial crisis of 2007–08.
Since late 2007, the expansion of subprime lending difficulties into a wider financial crisis plunged the United States into a renewed bear market that accelerated beginning on September 15, 2008. On October 8, the Wilshire 5000 closed below 10,000 for the first time since 2003. The index continued trading downward towards a 13-year low, reaching a bottom of 6,858.43 points, on March 9, 2009, representing a loss of about $10.9 trillion in market capitalization from its highs in 2007.
The Wilshire 5000 gained approximately $2.5 trillion in market value during the first 11 months of 2009 while the index rose 2,105 points.  Therefore, as of November 2009, each index point represented about $1.2 billion in market value.
The index achieved a new highest yearly close on December 31, 2012, a few percent above those of 1999 and 2007, but failed to do so above the 15,000 level (after achieving it intraday) by fewer than 5 points, closing with 14,995.11 points. However, it continued to rise in the short term such that, on February 8, 2013, the index surpassed the 16,000 level for the first time. It would be the first of four 1000-point milestones that the index reached in 2013, as the index closed above 17,000 for the first time on May 3, 18,000 for the first time on August 1, and 19,000 for the first time on November 14. The Wilshire 5000 would close out 2013 on a record high, finishing the December 31, 2013 trading session at 19,706.03 points.
On February 28, 2014, the Wilshire 5000 had its first intraday high over 20,000 points. On March 4, the index closed above this milestone for the first time. On July 1, 2014, the index closed above the 21,000 level for the first time; it would close above 25,000 for the first time in mid-2017.
On August 24, 2018, the Wilshire 5000 had its first intraday high and its first closing over 30,000 points.
In March 2020, the index closed below the 25,000 level for the first time since 2016.
On January 7, 2021, the Wilshire 5000 had its first intraday high and its first closing over 40,000 points.

Record high values

Versions
There are five versions of the index:
Full capitalization total return
Full capitalization price
Float-adjusted total return
Float-adjusted price
Equal weight
The difference between the total return and price versions of the index is that the total return versions accounts for reinvestment of dividends. The difference between the full capitalization, float-adjusted, and equal weight versions is in how the index components are weighted.  The full cap index uses the total shares outstanding for each company.  The float-adjusted index uses shares adjusted for free float.  The equal-weighted index assigns each security in the index the same weight.

Calculation
Let:

 M = Number of issues included in the index; 
 Pi = Price of one share of issue i included in the index;
 Ni = Number of shares of issue i for the full capitalization version, or the float of issue i for the float-adjusted version;
  = a fixed scaling factor.

The value of the index is then:

At present, one index point corresponds to a little more than US$1 billion of market capitalization.

The list of issues included in the index is updated monthly to add new listings resulting from corporate spin-offs and initial public offerings, and to remove issues which move to the pink sheets or that have ceased trading for at least 10 consecutive days.

Alternatives

The CRSP U.S. Total Market Index (ticker CRSPTM1) is a very similar comprehensive index of U.S. stocks supplied by the Center for Research in Security Prices.  It was especially designed for use by index funds. After Dow Jones and Wilshire split up, Dow Jones made their own total stock market index, called the Dow Jones U.S. Total Stock Market Index, similar to the Wilshire 5000.

Of the popular indexes, the Wilshire 5000 has been found to be the best index to use as a benchmark for US stock valuations.

See also
 Wilshire 4500
 Russell 3000
 Dow Jones & Company
 News Corporation
 NASDAQ OMX
 NYSE Euronext
 S&P 1500

References

External links
 
 Wilshire 5000 Family
 Yahoo! Finance page for W5000

American stock market indices